Halla Vilhjálmsdóttir (born 30 January 1982) is an Icelandic television, film actress, and singer.

Biography
Halla graduated in 2004 from the Guildford School of Acting in Guildford, Surrey, she worked in this time for ITV and the BBC.

Movie career
In 2002, Halla earned a role in the Icelandic drama film Gemsar, and starred in her first lead role in the 2006 comedy film Áramótaskaup. One year later, she portrayed Beta in Icelandic fantasy comedy film Astrópía. In 2009 she earned her first international role, playing a prisoner in the British mystery thriller film Ghost Machine under the pseudonym Hatla Williams.

Television career
Halla hosted the 2006 Icelandic version of The X Factor. In 2008, she played one of the lead roles in the Icelandic Crime television series Mannaveiðar. She has played various roles in TV comedies and sitcoms.

Stage career
She played the lead role in the Threepenny Opera at the Icelandic National Theatre, and the lead role of Arial in Footloose, among others.

Mountaineering career
Halla has summited four of the Seven Summits - Aconcagua 6,960m, Mount Elbrus 5,642m, Kilimanjaro 5,895m and Mount Vinson 4,892m.

Music career
The Soprano singer performed the song Roses in the fourth Semi-Final of the Iceland preliminaries for the Eurovision Song Contest 2009. Halla is the female lead singer of the Icelandic Pop band Villimadur.

Personal life
In 2007, she was briefly in a relationship with Hollywood star Jude Law.

In 2014, she married Colombian banker Harry Koppel in Bogota; they have one daughter (Louisa Koppel) born on 23 September 2015.

In 2015, she started an MBA at the University of Oxford with a GMAT score above 700.

Dubbing
 101 Dalmatians – Rolly
 Cinderella – Suzy
 The Lion King 2: Simba's Pride – Vitani
 Pinocchio – Dutch Puppet, French Puppet, and Russian Puppet
 The Jungle Book – Shanti
 The Little Mermaid 2: Return to the Sea – Melody

Filmography

References

External links

1982 births
Living people
Halla Vilhjalmsdottir
Halla Vilhjalmsdottir
Halla Vilhjalmsdottir
Alumni of the Guildford School of Acting
Halla Vilhjalmsdottir
Halla Vilhjalmsdottir
Halla Vilhjalmsdottir
Halla Vilhjalmsdottir
21st-century Icelandic women singers
Alumni of the University of Oxford